German submarine U-412 was a Type VIIC U-boat of Nazi Germany's Kriegsmarine during World War II.

She carried out one patrol. She sank or damaged no ships.

She was sunk northeast of the Faroe Islands on 22 October 1942 by a British aircraft.

Design
German Type VIIC submarines were preceded by the shorter Type VIIB submarines. U-412 had a displacement of  when at the surface and  while submerged. She had two shafts and two  propellers.

U-412 was fitted with five  torpedo tubes (four fitted at the bow and one at the stern), fourteen torpedoes, one  SK C/35 naval gun, 220 rounds, and a  C/30 anti-aircraft gun. The boat had a complement of between forty-four and sixty.

Service history
The submarine was laid down on 7 March 1941 at the Danziger Werft (yard) at Danzig (now Gdansk) as yard number 113, launched on 15 December and commissioned on 29 April under the command of Kapitänleutnant Walther Jahrmäker. She served with the 8th U-boat Flotilla from 29 April 1942 (training) and the 9th flotilla from 1 October.

Patrol and loss
U-412 departed Kiel on 17 October 1942. She was sunk on 22 October northeast of the Faroe Islands by depth charges dropped by a Vickers Wellington of No. 179 Squadron RAF. Forty-seven men died in U-412; there were no survivors.

References

Bibliography

External links

German Type VIIC submarines
U-boats commissioned in 1942
U-boats sunk in 1942
U-boats sunk by British aircraft
U-boats sunk by depth charges
1941 ships
Ships built in Danzig
Ships lost with all hands
World War II shipwrecks in the North Sea
World War II submarines of Germany
Maritime incidents in October 1942